William Townsend Brooks (February 27, 1945 – October 27, 2007) was an American football player and coach. He served as the head football coach at Canisius College from 1975 to 1981. Brooks was a standout player at Gettysburg College in Gettysburg, Pennsylvania .

References

1945 births
2007 deaths
Canisius Golden Griffins football coaches
Gettysburg Bullets football players
Syracuse Orange football coaches
High school football coaches in Virginia
Sportspeople from Woodbury, New Jersey
Players of American football from New Jersey